The Nellie Morse Stakes is an American Thoroughbred horse race held annually in January at Laurel Park Racecourse in Laurel, Maryland. The race is open to fillies and mares age four years old and up and is run at one mile (eight furlongs) on the dirt.

An ungraded Black type race, it currently offers a purse of $100,000. The race was previously called the Queen Isabella Stakes from 1941 through 1993.

The race was named in honor of Nellie Morse,  the last filly to win the Preakness Stakes  (prior to Rachel Alexandra in 2009) in 1924. Nellie Morse was a daughter of Luke McLuke and to date is the only horse ever to win both the Black-Eyed Susan Stakes and the Preakness Stakes. She won those races three days apart and ended the year with $60,250, which was the most earned by any thoroughbred that year.

As a broodmare, Nellie Morse left a legacy. Her daughter Nellie Flag was named two-year-old champion in 1934 and was the morning line and post time favorite in the 1935 Kentucky Derby (she finished fourth). Nellie Flag also raced in the Preakness Stakes but finished seventh. Nellie Morse's descendants, through Nellie Flag, include horse of the Year Forego, Kentucky Derby winner and champion three-year-old Bold Forbes, and champion handicap mare Mar-Kell.

Records 

Speed record: 
 1 mile - 1:36.20 - Northern Station   (2010) 
  miles - 1:49.00 - Stem the Tide   (1992)

Most wins by a horse:
 No horse has ever won more than one Nellie Morse Stakes

Most wins by an owner:
 2 - Calumet Farm   (1944, 1945)
 2 - Stephen E. Quick   (2005, 2007)

Most wins by a jockey:
 4 - Mario Pino    (1997, 1999, 2002, 2008)

Most wins by a trainer:
 2 - Christopher W. Grove    (2005, 2007)
 2 - James W. Murphy   (1992, 1994)
 2 - Ben A. Jones   (1944, 1945)

Winners

See also 
 Nellie Morse Stakes top three finishers
 Laurel Park Racecourse

References

External links
 Laurel Park website

|

Ungraded stakes races in the United States
Mile category horse races for fillies and mares
Laurel Park Racecourse
Horse races in Maryland
Recurring sporting events established in 1941